Robert 'Rab' Kilgour (born 20 October 1956 in Edinburgh) is a Scottish former footballer, who played for Meadowbank Thistle, Whitehill Welfare, Hibernian and St Johnstone.

References

1956 births
Living people
Scottish footballers
Scottish Football League players
Livingston F.C. players
Hibernian F.C. players
St Johnstone F.C. players
Footballers from Edinburgh
Association football defenders